Hans-Henrik Ørsted (born 13 December 1954 in Grenå) is a Danish former professional track cyclist and multi-medalist in the Olympics and World Championships at pursuit. He raced in many indoor Six-day racing events in Europe.

He turned professional following the 1980 Summer Olympics, where he won a bronze medal.

At the World Championships as a professional, he won 3 gold medals, 3 silver, and 2 bronze.

Palmarès 

 1977
 1st, Pursuit, National Track Championships, Copenhagen

 1978
 1st, Pursuit, National Track Championships, Århus
 1st, Points race, National Track Championships, Århus

 1980
 3rd, Pursuit, Olympic Games, Moscow
 3rd, Professional Pursuit, UCI Track Cycling World Championships, Besançon
 1st, Pursuit, National Track Championships, Odense

 1981
 1st, Six Days of Dortmund (with Gert Frank)
 1st, Madison, European Track Championships  (with Gert Frank)
 2nd, Professional Pursuit, UCI Track Cycling World Championships, Brno
 3rd, Grand Prix des Nations
 1st, Six Days of Herning (with Gert Frank)

 1982
 2nd, Professional Pursuit, UCI Track Cycling World Championships, Leicester
 1st, Nienburg

 1983
 1st, Madison, European Track Championships  (with Gert Frank)
 1st, Six Days of Herning (with Gert Frank)
 1st, Odense
 3rd, Professional Pursuit, UCI Track Cycling World Championships, Zürich

 1984
 1st, Six Days of Ghent (with Gert Frank)
 1st, Six Days of Munich (with Gert Frank)
 1st, Professional Pursuit, UCI Track Cycling World Championships, Barcelona

 1985
 1st, Six Days of Berlin (with Danny Clark)
 1st, Six Days of Copenhagen (with Gert Frank)
 1st, Professional Pursuit, UCI Track Cycling World Championships, Bassano del Grappa
 1st, Trofeo Baracchi (with Francesco Moser)

 1986
 2nd, Professional Pursuit, UCI Track Cycling World Championships, Colorado Springs
 Danmark Rundt
 1st, Prologue
 1st, Stage 5b

 1987
 1st, Professional Pursuit, UCI Track Cycling World Championships, Vienna

 1988
 1st, Six Days of Copenhagen (with Roman Hermann)

References

External links 

1954 births
Living people
Cyclists at the 1980 Summer Olympics
Danish male cyclists
Olympic bronze medalists for Denmark
Olympic cyclists of Denmark
UCI Track Cycling World Champions (men)
Olympic medalists in cycling
People from Norddjurs Municipality
Medalists at the 1980 Summer Olympics
Danish track cyclists
Sportspeople from the Central Denmark Region